River Devon may refer to several places:

River Devon, Clackmannanshire, a tributary of the River Forth in Clackmannanshire, Scotland
River Devon, Nottinghamshire, a tributary of the River Trent, England